Obo is the capital of Haut-Mbomou, one of the 14 prefectures of the Central African Republic.  It is close to the African Pole of Inaccessibility.

Poste Airport is located near the town.

History 
Obo was named after the local Zande chief Orbo, with the spelling changed slightly in later years. Orbo ruled the territory between the Mbokou and Kamou rivers. However, a conflict emerged when nearby Chief Gougbéré annexed much of Orbo's territory on the pretext that the inhabitants were from the same ethnic group as him. Orbo petitioned Sultan Zémio, who was his first cousin once removed, to help, but the sultan did not intervene. Orbo then asked French colonial captain Maurice Martin to mediate in 1910. Martin sided with Orbo's land claims, but said that any new settlements should be allowed to remain. 

French military general Jean Baptiste Marchand passed through the area on his journey to find the source of the Nile. When he failed to find access to the river, the settlement became a cul-de-sac and he moved on in a different direction.

The Africa Inland Mission established a presence in the town in 1925, run by the Linquist family. It was one of a number of evangelical missions among the Zande areas of Ubangi-Shari and the Belgian Congo.

On the night of 5 March 2008, Obo witnessed the first LRA's attack. The group attacked the AIM neighborhood and abducted 73 residents.

Central African Republic Civil War (2012-present)

On 9 May 2020 armed forces repelled an attack by the Union for Peace in the Central African Republic armed group on Obo, killing 11 militants. They repelled another attack on 18 May and another on 20 May, killing 12 militants. Between 26 and 27 July 2021, government forces repelled another attack on Obo by rebel groups affiliated with the Coalition of Patriots for Change. One Central African Armed Forces soldier was killed. With their town severely damaged by the attack, the residents of Obo organized a mass protest over MINUSCA's ineffectiveness at preventing violence in the area.

Gallery

References

Sub-prefectures of the Central African Republic
Populated places in Haut-Mbomou